is an Uruguayan television show that is broadcast on Channel 4. It debuted on March 14, 2017. Presented by Viviana Ruggiero, it consists of a panel that discusses current topics.

Format 
In each episode, the panel and a group of guests discuss a current topic. The panel is composed of Laura Raffo, Eduardo Brenta, Fernando Santullo, y Francisco Paig. The program seeks to encourage the diversity of opinions that may exist on the same topic. In addition, the audience can interact with the program by sending messages or voting in an opinion poll conducted through Twitter.

On-air staff 

 Daniel Castro (Presenter; 2017–2022)
Viviana Ruggiero (Panelist; 2018–2019; Presenter; 2020–present)
Laura Raffo (Panelist; 2021–present)
Eduardo Brenta (Panelist; 2021–present)
Fernando Santullo (Panelist; 2021–present)
Francisco Faig (Panelist; 2021–present)

Former on-air staff 

Adolfo Garcé (Panelist; 2020)
José Bayardi (Panelist; 2020)
 Conrado Hughes (Panelist; 2017–2020)
Gabriel Mazzarovich (Panelist; 2019)
Mónica Bottero (Panelist; 2017–2018)
 Óscar Andrade (Panelist; 2017–2018)
 Roberto Hernández (Panelist; 2017)
 Alejandra Labraga (Panelist; 2017)
 Jimena Sabaris (Opinion Poll; 2017)

Episodes

Awards and nominations

References 

Spanish-language television shows
Uruguayan television series
2017 Uruguayan television series debuts
Canal 4 (Uruguayan TV channel) original programming